Horama panthalon, the Texas wasp moth, is a moth of the subfamily Arctiinae. The species was first described by Johan Christian Fabricius in 1793. It is found in South America, Central America, Mexico, the Antilles and southern United States.

Adults are on wing year round. They mimic a paper wasp (Polistes species).

Subspecies
There are three subspecies:
Horama panthalon panthalon (Panama, north Colombia, north Venezuela and the Antilles)
Horama panthalon texana (Grote, 1868) (south Texas, Arizona, New Mexico, Florida, Mexico and Guatemala)
Horama panthalon viridifusca (Schaus, 1904) (south Brazil, north Argentina, Bolivia and Paraguay)

References

External links

Euchromiina
Moths of North America
Moths of Central America
Moths of the Caribbean
Moths of South America
Moths of Cuba
Lepidoptera of Argentina
Lepidoptera of Brazil
Lepidoptera of Colombia
Insects of Central America
Invertebrates of Bolivia
Invertebrates of Paraguay